Francisco Villarroel (born May 5, 1965) is a Venezuelan lawyer, writer, screenwriter and filmmaker. He is best known for the 2019 film Two Autumns in Paris, which is the adaptation of his novel of the same name published in 2007.

Biography 
 
Francisco Villarroel graduated as a lawyer from Santa Maria University, carrying out postgraduate and master's degree studies in France and Malta. He is a Doctor and Emeritus Professor at the Universidad Marítima del Caribe. For more than thirty (30) years he dedicated himself to the practice of law and university education publishing books on maritime law and international law. He was President of the Venezuelan  Maritime Law Association and Titular Member of the International Maritime Committee.

In 2007, he published his first novel that was made into a film, Two Autumns in Paris in 2019, which was followed by his second novel, Tango Bar, published in 2018. As an actor, screenwriter and film producer, he has made films that have been adapted from his novels. In 2017, he founded MOB Producciones.

In 2020, he directed his first film, Webidemic, whose original script he also wrote.

He is the Director of the Caracas Ibero-American Film Festival.

Filmography

Awards

Works

Legal books

Novels

Book of poems

References

External links 
 

1965 births
Living people
Venezuelan writers
20th-century Venezuelan lawyers
Venezuelan film producers
Venezuelan male film actors
Venezuelan film directors
Universidad Santa María (Venezuela) alumni
International Maritime Law Institute alumni
21st-century Venezuelan lawyers